Andrew Hart (born 9 March 1976) is an Australian former professional rugby league footballer.

Hart started his career at the Illawarra Steelers (1997-1998) and then spent time at the St. George Illawarra Dragons (1999-2001) and the South Sydney Rabbitohs (2002-2003). Hart finished his playing career with a year in the Super League with the London Broncos.

References

External links
Andrew Hart Yesterdays Hero

1976 births
Living people
Australian rugby league players
Illawarra Steelers players
Rugby league locks
Rugby league players from Wollongong
Rugby league props
Rugby league second-rows
South Sydney Rabbitohs players
St. George Illawarra Dragons players
South Sydney Rabbitohs captains